Andrés Roberto Yllana (born 30 July 1974) is a retired Argentine football player and current coach. He is the current manager of San Martín de San Juan.

Playing career
Yllana started his professional career with Gimnasia de La Plata in 1993, he played over 100 games for the club before moving to Italy where he played for Brescia and Verona.

In 2004 Yllana returned to Argentina and his old club Gimnasia de La Plata but left again in 2005 to join Belgrano de Córdoba at the end of the 2006-2007 season Belgrano were relegated from the Primera and Yllana moved on to join Arsenal de Sarandí. Playing only two games for Arsenal, he moved on again for the 2008 Clausura championship, this time to Nueva Chicago.

Coaching career
In 2020 he became Mauro Camoranesi's assistant at Slovenian PrvaLiga club NK Tabor Sežana. He successively followed Camoranesi at NK Maribor. He was dismissed by Maribor together with Camoranesi and his entire coaching staff on 23 February 2021.

Titles

References

External links
Andrés Yllana at Footballdatabase

1974 births
Living people
People from Rawson, Chubut
Argentine people of Spanish descent
Argentine footballers
Association football midfielders
Brescia Calcio players
Hellas Verona F.C. players
Club de Gimnasia y Esgrima La Plata footballers
Club Atlético Belgrano footballers
Arsenal de Sarandí footballers
Nueva Chicago footballers
Argentine expatriate footballers
Expatriate footballers in Italy
Argentine expatriate sportspeople in Italy
Argentine Primera División players
Expatriate football managers in Chile
Serie A players
Serie B players
Argentine football managers
Unión San Felipe managers
San Martín de San Juan managers